Little Ladyship is a 1939 comedy play by the British writer Ian Hay.

It premiered at the King's Theatre, Glasgow before beginning its West End run at the Strand Theatre and later transferring to the Aldwych Theatre. The original West End run lasted for 126 performances. The cast included Cecil Parker, Lilli Palmer, David Tree, Joan Greenwood, Aubrey Mather, Norma Varden, Diana King and Iris Vandeleur.

In March 1939 the BBC broadcast a recorded version of the play on television.

References

Bibliography
 Wearing, J.P. The London Stage 1930-1939: A Calendar of Productions, Performers, and Personnel.  Rowman & Littlefield, 2014.

1939 plays
Plays by Ian Hay
Comedy plays
West End plays